Mordova may refer (as misspelling) to

 Mordovia, a republic of Russia
 Moldova, the Republic of Moldova, a country in Eastern Europe

See also 
 Moldova (disambiguation)